Hjörtur Hermannsson (born 8 February 1995) is an Icelandic professional footballer who plays as a centre back for Serie B club Pisa and the Iceland national team.

Club career

Fylkir
Born in Reykjavík, Iceland, Hermannsson began his career at Fylkir, based in the Icelandic top division. After going through the ranks for the side, Hermannsson was involved in the first team, where he appeared in the first two matches of the season as an unused substitute. Weeks later, on 6 June 2011, Hermannsson made his Fylkir debut, where he came on as a late substitute, in a 3–1 loss against Stjarnan. Soon after, Hermannsson became a first team regular and then scored his first goal for the club, as well as his first professional goal, in a 2–1 win over Víkingur. Hermannsson went on to make nine appearances in his first season for the side.

Despite moving to PSV Eindhoven in the summer, Hermannsson then made three appearances for the side, adding his tally 12 games for Fylkir, with his first appearance came on 15 May 2012 against ÍA, which saw them lose 1–0.

PSV
After the Úrvalsdeild season came to an end, Hermannsson then went on a trial at Eredivisie side PSV Eindhoven on 29 October 2011. After impressing at the trial, Hermannsson signed a three-year deal with PSV, where he will join the club on 1 July 2012.

After years of development at the academy, Hermannsson made his professional debut as Jong PSV player in the Eerste Divisie on 18 August 2013 against FC Oss in a 4–0 home win. He replaced Jorrit Hendrix after 61 minutes. He made 25 league appearances during the 2013–14 season after a knee injury ended his season. In the 2014–15 season, Hermannsson continued to remain in the Jong PSV starting eleven despite suffering setback of injuries, which restricted him to 16 appearances. During the season, Hermannsson was called up to the senior team ahead of the match against NAC Breda, but did not play, as PSV went on to win 2–0 on 3 February 2015.

Ahead of the 2015–16 season, Hermannsson signed a contract with the club, keeping him until 2018. By the first half of the season, Hermannsson made 16 appearances for the side and it was announced on 16 February 2016, Hermannsson was loaned out to Allsvenskan club Göteborg until the summer. However, at the start of the season, Hermannsson suffered a hip injury while on international duty and was sidelined for weeks. After recovering, he then returned from injury and made his Göteborg debut on 2 May 2016, where he made his first start, in a 6–2 win over Gefle. From that moment on, Hermannsson became a first team regular for the side throughout May and June until his loan spell expired in the summer.

Brøndby
After his loan spell at Göteborg came to an end, Hermannsson joined Danish side Brøndby for €300,000 and viewed as the replacement for Daniel Agger, who retired at the end of the season. After missing out in the opening game of the season, Hermannsson made his Brøndby debut on 31 July 2016, where he made his first start and played the whole game, in a 2–2 draw against Horsens. Weeks later after making his debut, Hjörtur then scored his first goal for the club on 14 August 2016, in a 4–0 win over SønderjyskE. From that moment on, Hermannsson became a first team regular for the club.

Hermannsson won the Danish Cup with Brøndby in the 2017–18 season, with the team also making a failed push for the Danish championship, losing a comfortable lead to FC Midtjylland in the final matches of the season. With the Danish side, he also took part in UEFA Europa League qualifiers, never making it to the group stage as they were knocked out to Panathinaikos (2016), Hajduk Split (2017), Genk (2018), Braga (2019).

In the 2019–20 season, Hermannsson was utilised as the right-side centre-back in the 3–5–2 formation of head coach Niels Frederiksen, alongside team captain Andreas Maxsø and Anthony Jung. He was part of a revitalised defense during the season, as Brøndby finished fourth in the league table. Hermannsson made 31 appearances during the season.

After five years in Brøndby, Hermannsson left the club at the end of the 2020–21 season.

Pisa

On 16 July 2021, he joined Italian Serie B club Pisa on a four-year contract. On 14 August, he made his debut for the club against Cagliari in a 3–1 loss in the Coppa Italia. He made his Serie B debut eight days later on 22 August 2021 in a 1–0 win over SPAL.<ref>{{cite news |last1=Paletti |first1=Francesco |title=Buona la prima per il Pisa: contro la Spal decide la rete di Sibilli dopo 33 |url=https://www.lanazione.it/pisa/sport/calcio/buona-la-prima-per-il-pisa-contro-la-spal-decide-la-rete-di-sibilli-dopo-33-1.6721513 |work=La Nazione |date=22 August 2021 |language=it}}</ref>

Hermannsson scored his first goal for Pisa on 29 May 2022 in the play-off finals for promotion to the Serie A against Monza off a cross from Pietro Beruatto. Two goals in extra time by Monza won them the encounter 4–3 (6–4 on aggregate), to earn promotion to the 2022–23 Serie A, with Hermannsson and Pisa missing out.

International career
While at the duty for Iceland U17 and Iceland U19 for the past three years, Hermannsson was named as one of the promising players by UEFA ahead of the UEFA European Under-17 Championship in Slovakia and scored once during the campaign against France U17. Following the end of the tournament, Hjörturwas named Team of the Tournament.

The following year, Hermannsson was called up by Iceland U21 for the first time and made his Iceland U21 debut on 6 February 2013, where he played the whole game despite losing 3–0 against Wales U21. It wasn't until on 5 March 2014 when Hermannsson scored his first Iceland U21 goal, in a 3–2 loss against Kazakhstan U21. A year later, Hermannsson scored again on 5 September 2015, in a 3–2 win over France U21. In October 2016, Hermannsson captained Iceland U21 for the first time, which saw them win 2–0 against Scotland U21.

Hermannsson got his first call up to the senior Iceland squad for friendlies against Poland and Slovakia in November 2015. It wasn't until on 31 January 2016 when he made his senior team debut, coming on as a substitute in the second half, in a 3–2 loss against United States. He was selected for UEFA Euro 2016. However, Hermannsson did not make any appearance for Iceland throughout the UEFA Euro 2016, as they reached the quarter-final and lost to France. Despite making no appearances, Hermannsson stated that being called up for the UEFA Euro 2016 was the best day of his life.

Career statistics
Club

 International goals Scores and results list Iceland's goal tally first, score column indicates score after each Hjörtur goal.''

Honours
Brøndby
Danish Superliga: 2020–21
Danish Cup: 2017–18

References

External links
 

1995 births
Living people
Sportspeople from Reykjavík
Icelandic footballers
Association football defenders
Iceland international footballers
Iceland under-21 international footballers
Iceland youth international footballers
Úrvalsdeild karla (football) players
Eredivisie players
Eerste Divisie players
Allsvenskan players
Danish Superliga players
Serie B players
Jong PSV players
IFK Göteborg players
Brøndby IF players
Pisa S.C. players
Icelandic expatriate footballers
Expatriate footballers in the Netherlands
Expatriate footballers in Sweden
Expatriate men's footballers in Denmark
Expatriate footballers in Italy
Icelandic expatriate sportspeople in the Netherlands
Icelandic expatriate sportspeople in Sweden
Icelandic expatriate sportspeople in Denmark
Icelandic expatriate sportspeople in Italy
UEFA Euro 2016 players